Milad (ميلاد) is a Persian name of Persian origin. It is usually given as a first name to a male. It is mentioned that Milad was a Persian hero in "The Book of Kings". Milad, a legendary Persian prince from the earliest days of the Iranian Empire. A handsome and desirable young man, this name literally means "Son of the Sun". Using the sword forged by Kaveh the Blacksmith, In the 12th Story of Shahnameh, he is resurrected as the Zoroastrian God of Spirit, and goes on to play a prominent part in the story of Shahnameh. There is a similar word in Aramaic which is 'Moalada,' however, this itself is derived from the archaic Arabic 'Moalada.' It can also mean “Birth” in the Arabic Language.
Notable people and characters with the name include:

 Milad, an Iranian hero in Shahnameh
 Milad Ebadipour, Iranian volleyball player
 Milad Fakhreddini, Iranian footballer
 Milad Soleiman Fallah, Iranian footballer
 Milad Farahani, Iranian footballer
 Milad Gharibi, Iranian footballer
 Milad Meydavoudi, Iranian footballer
 Milad Mohammadi, Iranian footballer
 Milad Nouri (footballer, born 1986), Iranian footballer
Milad Nouri (footballer, born 1993), Iranian footballer
 Milad Omranloo, Iranian conductor
 Milad Rizk, Lebanese actor
 Milad Salem, Afghan footballer
 Milad Zeneyedpour, Iranian footballer

References